Araik Tunyan (born on January 6, 1966, Stepanavan) PhD in law sciences, docent, member of the Constitutional Court of Armenia.

Education
 1984–86 served in the Soviet Army.
 In 1994 graduated from the Department of Law of Moscow State University with honor.
 In 1995 took postgraduate study of Russian Academy of Sciences and obtained his PhD in Law.

Work experience
 1999–2001 worked as chief specialist department of legislative issues Ministry of Justice RA.
 since 2000 teaches at the Faculty of Law of the Russian-Armenian (Slavonic) State University.
 2001–03 worked as the deputy head of on legislative issues Ministry of Justice RA.
 2003–05 was head of the economic legislation of the Ministry of Justice RA.
 Since 2004 Head of the Department of Civil Law at the Law Faculty of the Russian-Armenian (Slavonic) University.
 2005–07 was as a head of the state legal department of the RA President.
 2007–14 was as a head of the Legal Department of the RA President.
 2014 June 9 was appointed as a member of the Constitutional Court of Armenia by the decision of the National Assembly of the RA.

Other
 By the December 28, 2013 decree of the President of Armenia, awarded the medal "Mkhitar Gosh".
 By the December 29, 2011 decree of the President of Armenia, awarded to the class rank of the state adviser of the civil service of Armenia.
 PhD in law sciences, docent. Author of the scientific articles on the theory of law, civil law, civil procedure and land rights.

References

1966 births
Living people
Armenian jurists
Moscow State University alumni